Thomas Price (19 January 1852 – 31 May 1909), commonly referred to as Tom Price, served as the South Australian United Labor Party's first Premier of South Australia. He formed a minority government at the 1905 election and was re-elected with increased representation at the 1906 election, serving in the premiership until his death in 1909. It was the world's first stable Labor government. Shortly afterwards, John Verran led Labor to form the state's first of many majority governments at the 1910 election.

Achievements of the Price government included free state secondary schools, the formation of wages boards and a minimum wage, establishing the Municipal Tramways Trust through nationalisation, the costly administration of the Northern Territory was surrendered to the Federal government, and reform (though limited) of the upper house. The government also attained successive budget surpluses and reduced the accumulated public debt.

Early life
Tom Price was born in Brymbo, Denbighshire, Wales in 1852 to John and Jane Price. His family moved to Liverpool in 1853 where Tom grew up. Tom Price emigrated to South Australia with his family in 1883. He was a stonecutter, teacher, lay preacher, businessman, stonemason and clerk-of-works. As a stonemason, Price helped to build the Parliament House of South Australia, a building he would later serve in as an elected politician.

Political career

Price quickly became involved in trade union activity, and was elected to the South Australian House of Assembly for Sturt in April 1893, becoming Labor leader in 1899. He contested the single statewide Division of South Australia at the 1901 federal election as the second of two Labor candidates behind Lee Batchelor. The seat elected seven members, Price finished eighth with a 38.2 percent vote.

World-first stable Labor government 1905−1909

Price came to power at the 1905 state election in a minority government, the Price-Peake administration, after increasing his party's representation from five to 15 in the 42-member lower house, with a primary vote of 41.3 percent, an increase of 22.2 percent. With the support of eight liberals headed by Archibald Peake, Price forced conservative Premier Richard Butler to resign. Price retained the premiership at the 1906 double dissolution election with an additional five Labor seats in the House of Assembly, just two short of a parliamentary majority in their own right, with a primary vote of 44.8 percent, an increase of 3.5 percent. It was the world's first stable Labor government, and was so successful that, following the 1910 election, Labor, led by John Verran, formed the first of the state's many majority governments. On Price's death in 1909, Peake formed a minority government until 1910.

Price introduced many reforms, including free state secondary schools, the formation of wages boards, the institution of a minimum wage, and the establishment of the Municipal Tramways Trust through nationalisation. The costly administration of the Northern Territory was surrendered to the Federal government, and there was limited reform of the Legislative Council. Price obtained a double dissolution on the issue of the reform of the upper house. Nevertheless, the Council continued to be intransigent regarding its reform, and Price accepted its compromise proposal of a £17 householder franchise. Labor's left wing criticised him for the concession.

The Price Government enacted a number of laws relating to social matters: the suppression of brothels and gaming, the control and care of drunkards, and the consolidation of legislation on the supply of alcohol and local option in liquor licensing. The government also achieved successive budget surpluses and reduced the accumulated public debt.

Legacy 

Price suffered from diabetes but died from tuberculosis of the throat or lungs at Mount Lofty on 31 May 1909. He was given a State funeral and buried at Mitcham Cemetery.

An island of the Whidby Group off the south-west coast of Eyre Peninsula had been left unnamed after Matthew Flinders' early explorations. It was named Price Island by the Government of South Australia in his honour. A guiding light for mariners was also erected on the island.

In 2015 a biography of Thomas Price was published and the book launch was attended by South Australian politicians from both sides of politics. At the launch, Premier Jay Weatherill labelled Price "a Labor hero".

In 2019, one hundred years after Price's death, a plaque was officially placed at Brownhill Creek Recreation Park in his honour.

Personal life
Tom Price married Anne Elizabeth Lloyd (c. 1860 – 1 September 1950) on 14 April 1881 at St David's Welsh Church of England in Liverpool. Their children included:
John Lloyd Price (14 February 1882 – 23 April 1941) MHA for Port Adelaide 1915–1925 and MHR.
Walter Davies Price MC (24 March 1886 – 29 July 1944) distinguished soldier and public servant.
Other children were Edward Hugh Price (1884–1954), engineer with the Harbors Board, (Thomas) Arthur Price (1888–1942), a railways employee, Annie Mary "Ann" Price (1890–1985), Ada Olive "Olive" Price (1891-1952) married Horace Wicks and Florence Gwendoline "Flo" Price (1894–1957) married Alfred Charles Clarke in 1920.

His widow was in 1915 one of four women appointed a Justice of the Peace, the first in Australia.

Tom Price was an active Methodist and Freemason.

References

 

|-

|-

|-

|-

|-

Australian Labor Party members of the Parliament of South Australia
Premiers of South Australia
1852 births
1909 deaths
Leaders of the Opposition in South Australia
Welsh emigrants to colonial Australia
20th-century deaths from tuberculosis
Members of the South Australian House of Assembly
19th-century Australian politicians
Tuberculosis deaths in Australia